Karuppariyalur Kutram Poruttha Naathar temple (கருப்பறியலூர் குற்றம் பொறுத்த நாதர் கோயில்) is a Hindu temple located at Thalaignayiru (or Thalainayar) in Nagapattinam district of Tamil Nadu, India.  The historical name of is Karuppariyalur or Karmanaasapuram. The presiding deity is Shiva. He is called as Kutram Poruttha Naathar(Aparaathakshameswarar). His consort is Kolvalai Naayaki .

Significance 
It is one of the shrines of the 275 Paadal Petra Sthalams - Shiva Sthalams glorified in the early medieval Tevaram poems by Tamil Saivite Nayanars Tirugnanasambandar and Sundarar.

Speciality 
The temple has a separate shrine called madakkovil (hilltop temple) dedicated to Bhairava (Sattanathar).

References

External links 
 
 
 

Shiva temples in Nagapattinam district
Padal Petra Stalam